Stalicoolithidae is an oofamily of fossil eggs.

History
Stalicoolithid eggs were first discovered in 1971, but they were described initially as Dendroolithids, or as Spheroolithids, in the case of "Paraspheroolithus" shizuiwanensis and Shixingoolithus.

Description
Stalicoolithids are distinguished from other oofamilies by several characteristics. Most significantly, they have secondary eggshell units in the outer zone, and three distinct subzones of the columnar layer. They have a unique mix of developmental characteristics, giving insight into the evolution of the amniotic eggshell.

Parataxonomy
Stalicoolithidae contains at least three oogenera: Coralloidoolithus, Stalicoolithus, and Shixingoolithus. Shixingoolithus contains two oospecies: S. erbeni and S. qianshanensis. Also, the enigmatic Parvoblongoolithus could potentially be a stalicoolithid.

References

Egg fossils
Fossil parataxa described in 2012
Stalicoolithids